Charade is a 1963 American romantic comedy mystery film produced and directed by Stanley Donen, written by Peter Stone and Marc Behm, and starring Cary Grant and Audrey Hepburn. The cast also features Walter Matthau, James Coburn, George Kennedy, Dominique Minot, Ned Glass, and Jacques Marin. It spans three genres: suspense thriller, romance and comedy.

Charade was praised by critics for its screenplay and the chemistry between Grant and Hepburn. It has been called "the best Hitchcock movie Hitchcock never made". It was filmed on location in Paris and contains animated titles by Maurice Binder. Henry Mancini's score features the popular theme song "Charade".

In 2022, the film was selected for preservation in the United States National Film Registry by the Library of Congress as "culturally, historically, or aesthetically significant".

Plot

While on holiday in the French Alps, Regina "Reggie" Lampert, an expatriate American working as a simultaneous interpreter, tells her friend Sylvie that she is divorcing her husband, Charles. She also meets Peter Joshua, a charming American.

On her return to Paris, she finds her apartment stripped bare. A police inspector says Charles sold off their belongings, then was murdered while leaving Paris. Their money is also missing. Reggie is given Charles's small travel bag, containing a letter addressed to her, a ship ticket to Venezuela, four passports in multiple names and nationalities, and other miscellaneous personal items. At Charles's sparsely attended funeral, three men show up to view the body. One sticks a pin into the corpse to confirm Charles is really dead.

Reggie is summoned to meet CIA administrator Hamilton Bartholomew at the American Embassy. She learns that the three men are Herman Scobie, Leopold W. Gideon, and Tex Panthollow. During World War II, they, Charles, and Carson Dyle were assigned by the OSS to deliver $250,000 ($ million in current dollars) in gold to the French Resistance, but instead stole it. Carson was fatally wounded in a German ambush, and Charles double-crossed the others, taking all the gold. The three survivors are after the missing money, as is the U.S. government. Hamilton insists Reggie has it, even if she does not know what or where it is—and that she is in great danger.

Peter finds Reggie and helps her move into a hotel. The three criminals separately threaten her, each convinced she knows where the money is. Herman then shocks her by claiming that Peter is in league with them, after which Peter says he is Carson Dyle's brother, Alexander, and is trying to bring the others to justice, believing they killed Carson.

As the hunt for the money continues, Herman and Leopold are murdered. Hamilton tells Reggie that Carson Dyle had no brother. When she confronts Alexander, he says he is actually Adam Canfield, a professional thief. Although frustrated by his dishonesty, Reggie still trusts him.

Reggie and Adam go to an outdoor market where Charles's last known appointment was. Spotting Tex, Adam follows him. At the stamp-selling booths, Adam and Tex each realize that Charles bought some extremely valuable stamps and affixed them to the envelope found in his travel bag. Both men race back to Reggie's hotel room, only to discover the stamps missing from the envelope. Reggie, who gave the stamps to Sylvie's young son, Jean-Louis, suddenly realizes their significance. She and Sylvie find Jean-Louis, but he has already traded the stamps to a dealer. They find the dealer, who says the rare stamps are worth $250,000 and returns them to Reggie.

Reggie returns to the hotel and finds Tex's body with the name "Dyle" scrawled next to it. Convinced Adam is the murderer, a frightened Reggie telephones Hamilton, who says to meet him at the Colonnade at the Palais-Royal. Adam sees her and gives chase. At the Colonnade, Reggie is caught out in the open between the two men. Adam claims Hamilton is really Carson Dyle: surviving the German ambush, he became obsessed with revenge and reclaiming the treasure. Reggie runs into an empty theater and hides in the prompt box. Carson is about to shoot her, but Adam activates a trapdoor under him. 

The next day, Reggie and Adam go to the embassy to turn over the stamps, but Adam declines to go in. Inside, Reggie discovers that Adam is really Brian Cruikshank, a U.S. Treasury agent responsible for recovering stolen government property. With his true identity now revealed, he proposes marriage to Reggie.

The film ends with a split-screen grid showing flashback shots of Cruikshank's four identities; Reggie says she hopes they have lots of boys, so they can name them all after him.

Cast

 Cary Grant as Brian Cruikshank (alias Peter Joshua, Alexander Dyle, and Adam Canfield)
 Audrey Hepburn as Regina "Reggie" Lampert
 Walter Matthau as Carson Dyle (alias Hamilton Bartholomew)
 James Coburn as Tex Panthollow
 George Kennedy as Herman Scobie
 Dominique Minot as Sylvie Gaudel
 Ned Glass as Leopold W. Gideon
 Jacques Marin as Inspector Edouard Grandpierre
 Paul Bonifas as Mr. Felix, the stamp dealer
 Thomas Chelimsky as Jean-Louis Gaudel

Production

When screenwriters Peter Stone and Marc Behm submitted their script The Unsuspecting Wife around Hollywood, they were unable to sell it. Stone then turned it into a novel, retitled Charade, which found a publisher and was serialized in Redbook magazine, as many novels were at the time. The series caught the attention of the same Hollywood companies that had passed on it earlier. The film rights were quickly sold to producer/director Stanley Donen. Stone then wrote the final shooting script, tailored to Cary Grant and Audrey Hepburn, with Behm receiving story co-credit.

Hepburn shot the film in the fall of 1962, immediately after Paris When It Sizzles, which was filmed that summer in a number of the same locations in Paris, but difficulties with the earlier production caused it to be released four months after Charade.

When the film was released at Christmas time, 1963, Audrey Hepburn's line, "at any moment we could be assassinated", was dubbed over with "at any moment we could be eliminated" due to the recent assassination of President John F. Kennedy. The dubbed word stood out quite clearly, so official video releases of the film have since restored the original dialogue, though some public domain videos taken from original release prints still carry the redubbed line.

At the end of the film, Hepburn lists Grant's aliases, concluding, “I hope we have a lot of boys and we can name them all after you.” In the Criterion Collection's 1999 commentary, Stone laments the fact that the music swells to mask his “best closing line”. Donen tells him he can say it now and get his own back. It is not clear whether they were not aware of the change—on the same commentary, Donen denies the restoration of “assassinated”—or if the soundtrack was altered after the commentary was recorded. Other discrepancies in the commentary include both men recalling that Grant was 60 at the time.

Cary Grant, who turned 58 during filming, was sensitive about the 25-year age difference between Audrey Hepburn (33 at the time of filming) and himself, and was uncomfortable with their romantic interplay. To address his concerns, the filmmakers agreed to add dialogue that has Grant's character comment on his age, and Regina — Hepburn's character — being portrayed as the pursuer.

Critical reception

Charade receives generally positive reviews, from 21st-century critics as well as contemporaries. The film has a 94% approval rating based on 50 reviews at Rotten Tomatoes, with an average score of 8.40/10 and the consensus: "A globetrotting caper that prizes its idiosyncratic pieces over the general puzzle, Charade is a delightful romp with Cary Grant and Audrey Hepburn's sparkling chemistry at the center of some perfectly orchestrated mayhem." On Metacritic the film has a score of 83% based on reviews from 16 critics, indicating "universal acclaim".

In a review published January 6, 1964, in The New York Times, Bosley Crowther criticized the film for its "grisly touches" and "gruesome violence", but also praised it for its screenplay with regard to its "sudden twists, shocking gags, eccentric arrangements and occasionally bright and brittle lines" as well as Donen's direction, said to be halfway between a 1930s screwball comedy and North by Northwest by Alfred Hitchcock, which also starred Grant.

In a Time Out review, the film was rated positively, with the assertion that it is a "mammoth audience teaser [...] Grant imparts his ineffable charm, Kennedy (with metal hand) provides comic brutality, while Hepburn is elegantly fraught". While reviewing the blu-ray DVD version of the film, Chris Cabin of Slant Magazine gave the film a three-and-a-half out of five rating, calling it a "high-end, kitschy whodunit" and writing that it is a "riotous and chaotic take on the spy thriller, essentially, but it structurally resembles Agatha Christie's And Then There Were None as well as describing it as "some sort of miraculous entertainment".

Accolades

American Film Institute list nominations
 2001 – AFI's 100 Years...100 Thrills
 2002 – AFI's 100 Years...100 Passions
 2005 – AFI's 100 Years of Film Scores

Public-domain status

The film includes a notice reading "MCMLXIII BY UNIVERSAL PICTURES COMPANY, INC. and STANLEY DONEN FILMS, INC. ALL RIGHTS RESERVED" but omitting the word "Copyright", "Copr." or the symbol "©". Before 1978, U.S. law required works to include the word "copyright" or an acceptable abbreviation or symbol (like a circled C) in order to be copyrighted. Because Universal failed to properly display the copyright notice, the film entered into the public domain in the United States immediately upon its release. As a result, copies from film prints of varying quality have been widely available on VHS, DVD and Blu-ray. The film is also available for free download at the Internet Archive. However, while the film itself is in the public domain, the original music remains under copyright if outside the context of the film. The film remains fully protected by copyright outside the U.S.

Soundtrack

The soundtrack album for the film, featuring Henry Mancini's score, was released in 1963 and reached No. 6 on Billboard magazine's pop album chart.

See also
 List of American films of 1963
 The Truth About Charlie, a 2002 remake of Charade

References

External links

 
 
 
 
 
 Charade: The Spy in Givenchy, an essay by Bruce Eder at the Criterion Collection

1963 films
1963 crime films
1963 romantic comedy films
1960s comedy mystery films
1960s comedy thriller films
1960s crime comedy films
1960s crime thriller films
1960s English-language films
1960s mystery thriller films
1960s romantic thriller films
American comedy mystery films
American comedy thriller films
American crime comedy films
American crime thriller films
American mystery thriller films
American romantic comedy films
American romantic thriller films
Edgar Award-winning works
Films directed by Stanley Donen
Films scored by Henry Mancini
Films set in Paris
Films shot at Billancourt Studios
Films shot in France
Films shot in Paris
Grammy Award for Best Engineered Album, Non-Classical
Romantic crime films
Treasure hunt films
Articles containing video clips
1960s American films
United States National Film Registry films